Johannes Alphonsus Huisman (30 April 1919 – 7 February 2003), also known as J. A. Huisman, was a Dutch philologist who specialized in Germanic studies.

Biography
Johannes Alphonsus Huisman was born in Wijk bij Duurstede, Netherlands on 30 April 1919. In May 1953, Huisman was appointed Professor of Comparative Germanic Linguistics and the Languages and Literature of the Germanic Peoples. He retired from the University of Utrecht in September 1982. The festschrift Palaeogermanica et onomastica (1989) was published in honor of Huisman on his 70th birthday. Huisman died in Zeist, Netherlands on 7 February 2003.

Selected works
 Neue Wege zur dichterischen und musikalischen Technik Walthers von der Vogelweide, 1950
 De hel-namen in Nederland, 1953
 De namen Betuwe en Veluwe, 1958
 Plaatsnamen van sacrale oorsprong, 1959
 Alliteratie in onze tijd, 1959
 Nette en onnette woorden, 1962
 Het Nederlands tussen dialect en wereldtaal, 1965
 Edda, 1980

See also
 Jan de Vries (philologist)
 Edgar C. Polomé
 René Derolez

References

1919 births
2003 deaths
Germanic studies scholars
Germanists
Linguists of Germanic languages
People from Wijk bij Duurstede
Utrecht University alumni
Academic staff of Utrecht University